Celina Traverso (born 17 March 1986) is an Argentine-born Italian field hockey player for the Italian national team.

She participated at the 2018 Women's Hockey World Cup.

References

1986 births
Living people
Argentine female field hockey players
Italian female field hockey players
Sportspeople from Santa Fe, Argentina
Expatriate field hockey players
Female field hockey defenders